Han Sung-joo (韓昇洲; born September 13, 1940 in Gyeongseong-si) is a Korean educator, diplomatist, diplomat, and politician. Han is a member of Cheongju Han clan.

He is a foreign diplomat of the Republic of Korea, former foreign minister and ambassador to the United States, and a diplomat who has been a professor since 1978 in the Department of Political Science and Diplomacy at Korea University.

After graduating from Seoul National University in 1962, he received a master's degree in political science from the University of New Hampshire in 1964 and a doctorate in political science from the University of California, Berkeley, in 1970. From February 1993 to December 1994, he was Minister of Foreign Affairs. In 2006, he retired from Korea University professorship. From June 2002 to February 2003 and from March 2007 to January 2008, he served as President of Korea University.

He was the 19th Ambassador to the United States from April 2003 to February 2005.

References 

Living people
Seoul National University alumni
Foreign ministers of South Korea
University of California, Berkeley alumni
Ambassadors of South Korea to the United States
Academic staff of Korea University
1940 births
Cheongju Han clan